Aulendorf is a town in the district of Ravensburg, in Baden-Württemberg, Germany.

Aulendorf exists of the town itself along with the incorporated villages Tannhausen, Bloenried and Zollenreute.

Aulendorf is well known in Upper Swabia for its catholic all-day high school "Studienkolleg St. Johann" founded by the Styler Missionaries.  It was once the capital of the historic German statelet of Königsegg.

Transport
Aulendorf is a local train hub for three lines:

 Herbertingen–Aulendorf railway
 Allgäu railway
 Southern railway

Culture and attractions
Aulendorf is located on the Upper Swabian Baroque Route and the Schwäbische Bäderstrasse.

Museums
 The adventure parcours Medialer Erlebnisparcours tells the history about the castle Schloss Aulendorf
 The museum Bürgermuseum presents the history of the town

Buildings
 The Catholic Church St. Martin contains exhibition pieces from all epochs from Gothic art to Classicism
 The castle Schloss Aulendorf united five epochs

Notables
 Hermann von Vicari (1773–1868), 1843–1868 archbishop of Freiburg
 Erwin Glonnegger (1925–2016), author and game designer, winner of the Order of Merit
 Gerhard Hennige (born 1940), sprinter, Olympic silver medalist 1968 Mexico

Twin towns — Sister cities

Aulendorf is twinned with:
 Conches-en-Ouche, France

References

External links

Towns in Baden-Württemberg
Württemberg
Ravensburg (district)